Dulce fugitiva is a 1980 Argentine telenovela. It stars Gerardo Romano and Silvina Rada.

Cast
Amelia Bence
Mirta Busnelli
Eloísa Cañizares
Emilio Comte
Claudio Corvalán
Daniel Lago
Marcela López Rey
María Noel
Cris Morena
Silvina Rada
Gerardo Romano
Eduardo Rudy
Jorge Villalba

References

1980 telenovelas
Argentine telenovelas
1980 Argentine television series debuts
1980 Argentine television series endings
Spanish-language telenovelas